William of Rennes, OP was a French friar in the Dominican Order, was a poet, theologian and expert on canon law. William was a Breton born in Thorigné in the thirteenth century.

William wrote an "Apparatus ad summam Raymundi", a set of annotations to the Summa de casibus poenitentiae of Raymond of Peñafort. A summa is a summary of academic theology and canon law. In 1235 William argued that the baptism without the parental consent of Jewish children was suitable as Jews had a "servile status before Christians", he maintained that just as slaves have no parental rights due to their status, this fact also held true for the Jews, and as such the forced conversion of Jewish children was acceptable.

William wrote the Arthurian epic Gesta Regum Britanniae, in Latin hexameters, which he completed just after 1236. It is similar to the Historia Regum Britanniae by Geoffrey of Monmouth and was meant to rival the epic Alexandreis by Walter of Châtillon The Gesta Regum Britanniae is based on the legend of King Arthur, and in it he compares the conquests by Arthur to those of Alexander the Great, as an illustration of the mistakes caused by an unjust war. The poem is of interest to scholars of Arthurian literature, in that it was the first attempt to turn a medieval hero into a hero of the classical ages.

References

Bibliography 

 

Members of the Dominican Order
13th-century French Roman Catholic priests
Canon law jurists
Breton Roman Catholic priests
Medieval Latin poets
13th-century Latin writers
13th-century French jurists